Dr G Gnanasambandam (Gurunathan Gnanasambandham; born 19 October 1955) also known as G Gnanasambandam, is an Indian professor, Tamil scholar, orator and an actor who appears in Tamil films. He frequently chairs Tamil debate shows (Pattimandrams). Dr G Gnanasambandam is originally from Sholavandan of Madurai district. He was a Professor of Tamil-language at Thiagarajar College, Madurai. He is known for his association with actor Kamal Haasan.

Filmography

Films

Television

List of books

 Vaanga Sirikkalam
 Paraparappu – Siripu
 Pesum Kalai
 Ulagam Ungal Kaiyil
 Indraya Sinthanai
 Valviyal Nagaichuvai
 Kalloori Athisayangal
 Ilakkiya Saaral
 Santhithathum Sinthithathum
 Medai Payanangal
 Jeykapovathu Neethan
 Sirithukondae Jeypom
 Kelvi Pathil
 Kadal Thaviya Kadhanayagan
 Gala Gala Kadaisi pakkam

Awards 

Tamil Nadu State Government Awards 2014 – Mahakavi Bharathiar Award

Tamil Nadu State Government Award 2005 – Kalaimamani Kalaimamani Award

References 

Living people
People from Madurai district
Male actors from Tamil Nadu
Male actors in Tamil cinema
21st-century Indian male actors
1955 births
Makkal Needhi Maiam politicians